Kabudeh may refer to:
Kabudeh-ye Olya, Kermanshah Province
Kabudeh-ye Sofla, Kermanshah Province
Kabudeh, South Khorasan
Kabudeh, Zirkuh, South Khorasan Province
Kabudeh-ye Abu ol Vafai
Kabudeh-ye Dehju
Kabudeh-ye Hasanabad